Belum Hasnain is a Pakistani politician who had been a member of the National Assembly of Pakistan from 2002 to May 2018.

Political career
She was elected to the National Assembly of Pakistan as a candidate of Pakistan Peoples Party from Punjab on a seat reserved for women in the 2002 Pakistani general election.

She was re-elected to the National Assembly of Pakistan as a candidate of Pakistan Peoples Party on a seat reserved for women from Punjab in the 2008 Pakistani general election.

She was re-elected to the National Assembly of Pakistan as a candidate of Pakistan Peoples Party on a seat reserved for women from Punjab in the 2013 Pakistani general election.

References

Living people
Pakistan People's Party politicians
Punjabi people
Pakistani MNAs 2013–2018
Pakistani MNAs 2002–2007
Pakistani MNAs 2008–2013
Women members of the National Assembly of Pakistan
Year of birth missing (living people)
21st-century Pakistani women politicians